High Gear is a 1933 American Pre-Code film directed by Leigh Jason. It stars James Murray and Joan Marsh. The film was known as The Big Thrill in the United Kingdom.

Plot
Mark "High Gear" Sherrod has been a race car driver for the past five years and is now at the height of his career. His co-driver Ed is the widowed father of Jimmy. Ed promised his wife before she died that he would send Jimmy off to a fine military school after winning the "big race". The day before the race finds Jimmy and Ed at home in their apartment, with Mr. and Mrs. Cohen visiting, and reporter Anne Merrit sneaking into Mark's hotel room for an exclusive interview. Mark agrees to give her the interview she needs over a dinner table. She break the date she already has for the night with her boss Larry Winston and goes out with Mark. Larry Winston walks into the same restaurant Mark and Anne are dining at, and sees them. Larry walks over to their table and has Anne introduce him to Mark. The two men become rivals.

On the day of the race, Mark gets behind when a tire goes flat. He enters the track again and starts to take the lead. While on the last lap, Mark loses control of his car and spins out just as he is about to pass the car in the lead. His car comes to a stop and before he can move out of the way, he is hit dead on by another car going full speed. Mark somehow comes out of this accident unscathed, but his partner Ed is killed. Jimmy, now an orphan, is staying with the Cohen's. Mark returns and the Cohen's decide to tell him they would like to adopt Jimmy. Before they are able to however, Mark asks Jimmy if he wants to come and live with him at his hotel. Jimmy accepts, Mark promises to send him to that military school, and Mrs. Cohen silently bursts into tears.

Mark sends Jimmy to the URBAN Military Academy and hits the track again with his new co-driver Howard. Unfortunately, Mark is plagued by crude flashbacks of Ed and the accident. He tells Howard he is through with racing and walks away. Strapped for cash, Mark leaves his fancy hotel, moves in with Mr. and Mrs. Cohen, and takes a job as a taxi driver to pay for Jimmy's school. While waiting for customers, Mark gets into a fight with another cabbie for being in the wrong space. Anne, who has been unable to find Mark since he moved, spots him in his taxi and finds his new residence through his license number. Anne promises to not mention Marks "fall from fame" and has dinner with him. While dropping Anne off at her office, Mark is spotted by Larry Winston. Larry asks Anne who her taxi driver was and when she does not tell him, he comes to the correct conclusion on his own. Larry promises to Anne that he will not say anything about Mark's new career, but later breaks his promise when he delivers his news report the next afternoon.

Mark hears this report on the radio and becomes infuriated. Jimmy also hears the report with his school mates and is laughed out of the room. Mark hurries to confront Anne and does not believe her when she says she didn't say anything. While there, he gets into another argument with two other cabbies. Jimmy comes to the conclusion that Mark cannot afford to keep him at URBAN, so he sneaks out of a window and returns to the Cohen's apartment for a "surprise visit". Mark is at first happy, but then becomes upset when Jimmy refuses to return school. Two rival cab drivers go to Mark's home and begin tearing up his cab. Mark goes out and gets into an all out brawl with them. Jimmy gets caught up in the middle and is hit in the head with a flying wrench, which "crushes" his skull. Anne tells Mark more or less to drive Jimmy to this hospital as quick as he can. Over time, Jimmy recovers and is later seen in the hospital talking to friends. Mark returns to racing and wins another big race, with Anne right by his side.

Cast
 James Murray as Mark 'High Gear' Sherrod
 Joan Marsh as Anne Merritt
 Jackie Searl as Jimmy Evans
 Eddie Lambert as Jake Cohen, Janitor
 Ann Brody as Mrs. Cohen
 Theodore von Eltz as Larry 'Keyhole' Winston
 Lee Moran as Howard, Mechanic
 Mike Donlin as Ed Evans
 Gordon De Main as Maj. Edwards - Military Academy Commandant
 Douglas Haig as Percy
 George O'Hanlon as Reporter

External links
 
 

1933 films
1933 romantic drama films
American auto racing films
American black-and-white films
Films directed by Leigh Jason
American romantic drama films
1930s English-language films
1930s American films